Catalpic acid  is a conjugated polyunsaturated fatty acid. The melting point of this fatty acid is 32 °C. Catalpic acid occurs naturally in the seeds of yellow catalpa (Catalpa ovata) and southern catalpa (Catalpa bignonioides). Seeds of Catalpa species contain about 40% catalpic acid.

References

Fatty acids
Alkenoic acids
Polyenes